The sixth season of the reality television series Black Ink Crew premiered on December 6, 2017 until May 9, 2018 on VH1. It chronicles the daily operations and staff drama at an African American-owned and operated tattoo shop in Harlem, New York.

Cast

Main
 Ceaser Emanuel
 Sky Day
 Donna Lombardi
 Ted Ruks
 Melody Mitchell
 Walt Miller 
 Young Bae

Recurring
O'S**t Duncan
Miss Kitty
Kevin Laroy
Jadah Blue 
Alex "The Vagina Slayer"
Tatiana

Guest 
Karlie Redd – Ceaser's ex-lover
Persuasian – Ceaser's fling, Oxygen’s Bad Girls Club
Crystal – Ceaser's baby mama
Lalo – Melody's baby daddy
Allison – Sky's friend
Mo – Donna's boyfriend
Rob – Bae's boyfriend
Nikki – O'S**t's wife
Puma Robinson — O'S**t's friend.
Crystal Marie — Ceaser's best friend.

Episodes

References

2017 American television seasons
2018 American television seasons
Black Ink Crew